Morrisania is a residential neighborhood in the southwestern Bronx, New York City, New York. Its boundaries are the Cross-Bronx Expressway to the north, Crotona-Prospect Avenue to the east, East 161st Street to the south, and Webster Avenue to the west. Third Avenue is the primary thoroughfare through Morrisania.  Its name derives from the Manor of Morrisania, once the entire South Bronx.

The name derives from the Manor of Morrisania, the vast 2,000 acre estate of the powerful and aristocratic Morris family, who at one time owned most of the Bronx as well as much of New Jersey. The family includes Lewis Morris, 4th Lord of the Manor, and a signer of the United States Declaration of Independence, and Gouverneur Morris, penman of the United States Constitution. Both are buried in the crypt at St. Ann's Church of Morrisania. Today the name is most commonly associated with the neighborhood of Morrisania, which is only a small corner of the original Morrisania.

Morrisania is part of Bronx Community Board 3, and its ZIP Codes include 10456 and 10459. The area is patrolled by the NYPD's 42nd Precinct. NYCHA property in the area is patrolled by P.S.A. 7 at 737 Melrose Avenue in the Melrose section of the Bronx.

History

From 1644 to the early 20th century,  the land of the neighborhood was the estate of the Morris family in Westchester County. In 1790, Lewis Morris, owner of the estate and signer of the Declaration of Independence, proposed the land as the site of the federal capital.

The area was sparsely populated until 1840, when Gouverneur Morris Jr., son of the famous congressional delegate and nephew of Lewis, allowed a railroad to be built across the property. In 1848, he sold the land next to the line for the development of a new town called Morrisania Village. In 1855, additional settlements along the rail line became the town of Morrisania (with its own police force), with its political center in the original 1840 village (which eventually incorporated in 1864). At first the village was an early forerunner of today's bedroom communities, populated by people who worked in Manhattan, but it quickly developed its own local industries and craftsmen as it developed into a full-fledged town. In 1874, the area was annexed to New York City (then consisting only of Manhattan) as part of the Twenty-Third Ward. In 1887, the Third Avenue Elevated was extended to the area to provide easy and quick access to and from Manhattan. By the time the New York City Subway was extended to the area in 1904, a large influx of European immigrants had given the neighborhood an urban character, with a high concentration tenement buildings replacing houses as the dominant form of dwelling.

In the 1950s along with changing demographics, Robert Moses destroyed various tenements in favor of a colony of public housing. After the construction of the Cross-Bronx Expressway, the poverty that East Tremont suffered spread into Morrisania. As a result, and also due to the aggressive 1968 Program for Action, the Third Avenue El closed in 1973. During this time period a wave of arson destroyed or damaged many of the residential, commercial, and industrial structures in the area.

Many social problems associated with poverty, from crime to drug addiction, have plagued the area for some time. Despite crime declines versus their peaks during the crack and heroin epidemics, violent crime continues to be a serious problem in the community. Morrisania has significantly higher drop-out rates and incidents of violence in its schools. Other problems in local schools include low test scores and high truancy rates. Drug addiction is also a serious problem in the community. Due to the lucrative drug trade in the area, many addicts reside in the community. Peer pressure among children who come from broken homes contributes to the high rate of usage. Many households in the area are headed by a single mother, which contributes to the high poverty rate. Single parent homes often have a harder time providing at the same level as two-parent homes. Many of the families living in Morrisania have been in poverty for generations. The incarceration rate in the area is also very high. Morrisania is home to a significant number of inmates currently held in New York state prison and jail facilities.

After a wave of arson ravaged the low income communities of New York City throughout the 1970s, most of the residential structures in Morrisania were left seriously damaged or destroyed. The city began to rehabilitate many formally abandoned tenement style apartment buildings and designate them low income housing beginning in the late 1970s. Also many subsidized attached multi-unit townhouses and newly constructed apartment buildings have been or are being built on vacant lots across the neighborhood.

Demographics
Today's Morrisania is a low-income neighborhood that predominantly consists of Latin Americans and African Americans.

Based on data from the 2010 United States Census, the population of Morrisania was 37,865, a change of 8,068 (21.3%) from the 29,797 counted in 2000.

The racial makeup of the neighborhood was 1.4% (523) White, 38.4% (14,531) African American, 0.2% (94) Native American, 0.5% (205) Asian, 0% (11) Pacific Islander, 0.3% (127) from other races, and 0.9% (339) from two or more races. Hispanic or Latino of any race were 58.2% (22,035) of the population.

The entirety of Community District 3, which comprises Morrisania and Crotona Park East, had 91,601 inhabitants as of NYC Health's 2018 Community Health Profile, with an average life expectancy of 76.2 years. This is lower than the median life expectancy of 81.2 for all New York City neighborhoods. Most inhabitants are youth and middle-aged adults: 29% are between the ages of between 0–17, 29% between 25–44, and 21% between 45–64. The ratio of college-aged and elderly residents was lower, at 12% and 9% respectively.

As of 2017, the median household income in Community Districts 3 and 6, including Tremont and Belmont, was $25,972. In 2018, an estimated 31% of Morrisania and Crotona Park East residents lived in poverty, compared to 25% in all of the Bronx and 20% in all of New York City. One in six residents (16%) were unemployed, compared to 13% in the Bronx and 9% in New York City. Rent burden, or the percentage of residents who have difficulty paying their rent, is 60% in Morrisania and Crotona Park East, compared to the boroughwide and citywide rates of 58% and 51% respectively. Based on this calculation, Morrisania and Crotona Park East are gentrifying.

Land use and terrain

Morrisania is dominated by public housing complexes of various types, vacant lots, and tenement buildings. Most of the original housing stock which consisted of older multi-unit homes and tenements were structurally damaged by arson and eventually razed by the city. The total land area is over a square mile. The terrain is somewhat hilly.

Morris High School Historic District
The landmarked Morris High School Historic District is north of the Forest Houses. The two square blocks between Boston Road, Forest Avenue, and East 166th Street have Morris High School and adjacent brownstones.

Clay Avenue Historic District
The Clay Avenue Historic District consists of two blockfronts on Clay Avenue between 165th and 166th Streets. The district retains a well preserved architectural character dating back to early urban development in the Bronx consisting of Romanesque Revival forms and neo-Renaissance motifs. Prior to being developed as a residential avenue, Clay Avenue had been part of Fleetwood Park Racetrack, a horse trotting track used by the New York Driving Club.

Public housing developments

Twenty NYCHA developments are located in Morrisania:
 1162-1176 Washington Avenue; one rehabilitated 6-story tenement building
 Butler Houses; six 21-story buildings
 Claremont Parkway-Franklin Avenue Area; three buildings, 3 and 7 stories tall
 Davidson Houses; one 8-story building
 Eagle Avenue-East 163rd Street; one 6-story building
 Forest Houses; fifteen buildings, 9, 10 and 14 stories tall
 Franklin Avenue I (Conventional); three rehabilitated tenement buildings, 5 stories tall
 Franklin Avenue I M.H.O.P. (Multi Family Homeownership Program); two rehabilitated tenement buildings, 5 stories tall
 Franklin Avenue II (Conventional); three rehabilitated tenement buildings, 5 stories tall
 Franklin Avenue III (Conventional); one 5-story rehabilitated tenement building
 Franklin Avenue III M.H.O.P. (Multi Family Homeownership Program); three rehabilitated tenement buildings, 5 stories tall
 Jennings Street M.H.O.P. (Multi Family Homeownership Program); three rehabilitated tenement buildings, 5 stories tall
 McKinley Houses; five 16-story buildings
 Morris I; ten buildings, 16 and 20 stories tall
 Morris II; seven buildings, 16 and 20 stories tall
 Morrisania Air Rights; two 16-story buildings
 PSS Grandparent; one 6-story building
 Union Avenue-East 163rd Street; one nine-story building
 Union Avenue-East 166th Street; six 3-story buildings
 Webster Houses; five 21-story buildings

Police and crime
Morrisania and Crotona Park East are patrolled by the 42nd Precinct of the NYPD, located at 830 Washington Avenue. The 42nd Precinct ranked 45th safest out of 69 patrol areas for per-capita crime in 2010. , with a non-fatal assault rate of 161 per 100,000 people, Morrisania and Crotona Park East's rate of violent crimes per capita is greater than that of the city as a whole. The incarceration rate of 1,243 per 100,000 people is higher than that of the city as a whole.

The 42nd Precinct has a lower crime rate than in the 1990s, with crimes across all categories having decreased by 63.3% between 1990 and 2022. The precinct reported 7 murders, 44 rapes, 437 robberies, 672 felony assaults, 314 burglaries, 515 grand larcenies, and 293 grand larcenies auto in 2022.

Fire safety
Morrisania contains two New York City Fire Department (FDNY) fire stations. Engine Co. 50/Ladder Co. 19/Battalion 26 is located at 1155 Washington Avenue, while Rescue 3 is located at 1655 Washington Avenue.

In addition, FDNY EMS Station 26 is located at 1264 Boston Road.

Health
, preterm births and births to teenage mothers are more common in Morrisania and Crotona Park East than in other places citywide. In Morrisania and Crotona Park East, there were 107 preterm births per 1,000 live births (compared to 87 per 1,000 citywide), and 35.6 births to teenage mothers per 1,000 live births (compared to 19.3 per 1,000 citywide). Morrisania and Crotona Park East has a relatively average population of residents who are uninsured. In 2018, this population of uninsured residents was estimated to be 12%, equal to the citywide rate of 12%.

Sixteen percent of Morrisania and Crotona Park East residents are smokers, which is higher than the city average of 14% of residents being smokers. In Morrisania and Crotona Park East, 36% of residents are obese, 22% are diabetic, and 32% have high blood pressure—compared to the citywide averages of 24%, 11%, and 28% respectively. In addition, 20% of children are obese, compared to the citywide average of 20%.

Eighty-one percent of residents eat some fruits and vegetables every day, which is less than the city's average of 87%. In 2018, 69% of residents described their health as "good," "very good," or "excellent," lower than the city's average of 78%. For every supermarket in Morrisania and Crotona Park East, there are 10 bodegas.

The nearest hospitals are NYC Health + Hospitals/Lincoln in Melrose and Bronx-Lebanon Hospital Center in Claremont.

Post offices and ZIP Codes
Morrisania is mostly covered by the ZIP Codes 10456, although the southern edge of the neighborhood is part of 10451 and the northernmost several blocks are part of 10457. The United States Postal Service operates two post offices in Morrisania:
 Melcourt Station – 860 Melrose Avenue
 Morrisania Station – 442 East 167th Street
 Hub Station – 633 St. Ann's Avenue

Education 
Morrisania and Crotona Park East generally have a lower rate of college-educated residents than the rest of the city . While 19% of residents age 25 and older have a college education or higher, 36% have less than a high school education and 45% are high school graduates or have some college education. By contrast, 26% of Bronx residents and 43% of city residents have a college education or higher. The percentage of Morrisania and Crotona Park East students excelling in math rose from 19% in 2000 to 41% in 2011, and reading achievement increased from 28% to 32% during the same time period.

Morrisania and Crotona Park East's rate of elementary school student absenteeism is more than the rest of New York City. In Morrisania and Crotona Park East, 34% of elementary school students missed twenty or more days per school year, higher than the citywide average of 20%. Additionally, 63% of high school students in Morrisania and Crotona Park East graduate on time, lower than the citywide average of 75%.

Schools
Public schools include:

 PS 2/63: Morrisania (East 169th Street and Franklin Avenue)
 PS/MS 4: Crotona Park West (East 173rd Street and Fulton Avenue)
 PS 42: Claremont Village (Claremont Parkway and Washington Avenue)
 PS 35: Franz Siegel (East 163 Street and Grant Avenue)
 PS 88: Morrisania (Sheridan Ave and Marcy Place)
 PS 90: George Meany (McClellan and Sheridan Avenue)
 PS 53: Basheer Quisim School (East 168th Street)
 PS 55: Benjamin Franklin (St. Paul's Place and Washington Avenue)
 PS 110: Theodore Schoenfield (Crotona Park South and Fulton Avenue)
 PS 132: Garrett A. Morgan (East 168th Street and Washington Avenue)
 PS 140: Eagle (East 163rd Street and Eagle Avenue)
 PS 146: Edward "Pops" Collins (East 164th Street and Cauldwell Avenue)
 PS 186: Walter J. Damrosch Day Treatment Center (Jennings Street and Union Avenue)
 PS 198:(East 168th Street and Tinton Avenue)
 PS/MS 212: Theodore Gathings (Home Street and Union Avenue)
 PS 463-Urban Scholars Community School
 MS 128: Mott Hall III (St. Paul's Place and Washington Avenue) [occupying the 5th & 6th floor of the Benjamin Franklin School]
 MS 145: Arturo Toscanini (East 165th Street and Teller Avenue)
 MS 219: Charles Richard Drew (East 169th Street and Third Avenue)
 MS 301: Paul Laurence Dunbar (East 161st Street and Cauldwell Avenue)
 MS 313/339: Diana Sands (East 172nd Street and Webster Avenue)
 Morris High School (East 166th Street and Boston Road)
 Jane Addams High School (East 161st Street and Tinton Avenue)
 Bronx Center for Science and Mathematics (East 169th Street and Fulton Avenue)
 Eximius College Preparatory Academy (East 169th Street and Fulton Avenue)
 Bathgate High School Campus (Claremont Parkway and Bathgate Avenue)
 Success Academy Bronx 3, a K–2 charter school
 The Eagle Academy for Young Men (East 176th Street and Third Avenue)

Libraries
The New York Public Library operates the Morrisania branch at 610 East 169th Street. The branch, a Carnegie library, opened in 1908 and was designed by Babb, Cook & Willard. Another branch, the Grand Concourse branch, is located at 155 East 173rd Street. The branch is a two-story structure that opened in 1959.

Transportation

There are no New York City Subway stations in Morrisania, though several bus routes connect with subway stations. The following MTA Regional Bus Operations bus routes serve Morrisania:
  and Bx6 SBS: to Hunts Point or Riverside Drive (via 161st and 163rd Streets)
 : to Parkchester station or George Washington Bridge Bus Terminal (via 170th Street, Claremont Parkway, 174th Street)
 : to Fordham Plaza or The Hub (via Third Avenue)
 : to Westchester Square–East Tremont Avenue or Third Avenue–138th Street (via Boston Road–Morris Park Avenue)
 : to Crotona Park East or George Washington Bridge Bus Terminal (via 167th Street)
  and Bx41 SBS: to Gun Hill Road or Third Avenue–149th Street (via Webster Avenue)

Notable people
 Iran Barkley, former professional boxer who competed from 1982 to 1999, uncle of NFL star Saquon Barkley
 Ray Barretto (1929–2006), percussionist and bandleader of Puerto Rican ancestry
 Eric Burroughs (1911–1992), stage and radio actor.
 Big Pun, rapper, was raised on 163rd and Rogers Place, a mural stands in his honor on the street.
 Boogie Down Productions, rap group, KRS-1 was discovered at homeless shelter at the Morrisania Armory on 166th Street and Franklin Avenue by Scott LaRock who was a social worker there
 Coko, lead singer of R&B group SWV, raised in Forest Houses
 Chick Corea, jazz composer, keyboardist, bandleader, and occasional percussionist
 Diamond D, rapper and boom bap producer from Forest Houses, founding member of Diggin' in the Crates Crew
 Gloria Davis (born 1938), politician who served in the New York State Assembly.
 Estella B. Diggs (1916–2013), politician who served in the New York State Assembly.
 Fat Joe (born 1970), rapper from Forest Houses.
 Grandmaster Flash, hip-hop DJ considered to be one of the pioneers of scratching, cutting, and mixing and the leader of Grandmaster Flash & The Furious Five inductees into the Rock and Roll Hall of Fame, grew up Fox Street right off 163rd
 Lord Finesse, rapper from Forest Houses
 Elmo Hope, jazz pianist, composter, and arranger best known for his work the bebop and hard bop genres, grew up on Lyman Place
 Keef Cowboy, dancer and hypeman known as pioneer in the "call and response" style credited with coining term "hip-hop", from Prospect Avenue
 Edward Stanley Kellogg (1870–1948), 16th Governor of American Samoa.
 Cuban Link, rapper was raised on Prospect Avenue
 Orlando Marin, Latin jazz and mambo bandleader and timbales player
 Melle Mel, rapper and lead vocalist of Grandmaster Flash & The Furious Five
 Lewis Morris (1726–1798), chief justice of New York and British governor of New Jersey, was the first lord of the manor of Morrisania in New York City, signed the Declaration of Independence.
 Gouverneur Morris (1752–1816), statesman who wrote the Preamble to the United States Constitution.
 The Kidd Creole, member of Grandmaster Flash & The Furious Five and brother of Melle Mel
 The Wrens, doo-wop group were raised in Morrisania and attended Morris High School where they formed the group.
 Pucho & His Latin Soul Brothers, Latin jazz, soul, and R&B group
 The Chords, doo-wop group
 The Chantels, pop, doo-wop, and rock and roll group
 Lillian Leach, doo-wop singer and lead vocalists of group The Mellows
 Thelonious Monk, American jazz pianist and composer, lived on Lyman Place for some years
 Charlie Palmieri, renowned bandleader and musical director of salsa music
 Eddie Palmieri, Grammy Award-winning pianist, bandleader, musician, and composer
 Colin Powell, American politician, diplomat and retired four-star general who served as the 65th United States Secretary of State from 2001 to 2005. Powell was the first African-American Secretary of State., grew up on Kelly Street and attended Morris High School
 Desi Rodriguez, basketball player, grew up on Washington Avenue
 Tito Rodriguez, mambo, chacha, bolero, pachanga, cha cha cha, and guaracha bandleader and singer, lived on Rogers Place
 Mongo Santamaria, Afro-Cuban percussionist and bandleader
 Romeo Santos, singer, songwriter, actor, record producer, and lead vocalist of the bachata band Aventura, grew up near Boston Road and attended Morris High School
 Showbiz, rapper and producer from Forest Houses and one half of duo Showbiz & AG
 Maxine Sullivan, jazz vocalist and performer, lived on Ritter Place
 Helen Rand Thayer (1863-1935), suffragist and social reformer
 Frederick Trump (1869–1918), grandfather of 45th president of the United States Donald Trump lived at 1006 Westchester Avenue in the then German-speaking Morrisania with his wife Elizabeth and their family.
 Elsie Washington, novelist
 Xtreme, bachata duo, grew up on East 169th Street
 Jerry Jemmott, Grammy Award winning musician/composer.

References

External links
 
 Morrisania in Forgotten NY

 
Former towns in New York City
Former villages in New York City
Neighborhoods in the Bronx
1855 establishments in New York (state)